Carthage is a city in Jasper County, Missouri, United States. The population was 15,522 as of the 2020 census. It is the county seat of Jasper County and is nicknamed "America's Maple Leaf City."

History

Jasper County was formed in 1841. Carthage was chosen as the county seat, the area cleared and the town platted in 1842. The city was named after ancient Carthage. By the time of the American Civil War, there were over 500 residents, a brick and stone courthouse, and several businesses.

The area was divided over slavery, and almost all of the African-Americans in the county at the time were slaves. The Battle of Carthage, fought on July 5, 1861, was a clash between Union troops from St. Louis and Confederate troops led by the pro-Southern Missouri Governor Claiborne Fox Jackson.  The "Second Battle of Carthage" occurred in October 1863 when Union troops confronted Confederate troops north of town and forced them to return to Arkansas. The town experienced minor skirmishes and attacks throughout the war; pro-Confederate guerrillas burned most of the city (including the courthouse) in September 1864. Historical accounts, such as Jasper County, Missouri in the Civil War (1923) by Col. Ward L. Schrantz, document the regional warfare.

The area grew rapidly following the Civil War. The Missouri Western Railroad arrived in 1872. Town residents started a foundry, furniture factory, woolen and grain mills, a plow works and numerous liveries and other businesses. Leggett & Platt, now a Fortune 500 company still based in Carthage, was founded in 1883. Nearby lead mines and limestone quarries also contributed significant wealth and Carthage became one of the most prosperous towns in the area. Residents poured their money into ornate Victorian-style homes, many of which are now part of the Carthage South District, which was named to the National Register of Historic Places in 1982.  The Jasper County Courthouse, also on the National Register of Historic Places, was built of Carthage stone in 1894–95. There is a mural inside the courthouse depicting the history of Jasper County. Growth in Carthage can be documented through Sanborn maps, many of which are available online.

Numerous local buildings, in addition to the courthouse, were built in the late 19th and early 20th century out of stone from local quarries. The limestone is hard enough to be polished into "Carthage marble" and was used in both the interior and exterior of the state capitol building in Jefferson City, Missouri. The quarries known today as the Carthage Underground, a commercial space that utilizes but a small portion of the extensive uncharted quarries nearby.

In 1925, Ozark Wesleyan College merged three Methodist colleges into one institution and built a campus in the center of town. The college operated only a few years before closing. The campus was home to Our Lady of the Ozarks College from 1944 to 1971 and now houses the Vietnamese-American Catholic religious Congregation of the Mother Co-Redemptrix. This Vietnamese order of priests and brothers came from Vietnam and settled in Carthage in 1975, immediately following the Vietnam War. In the monastery of this Vietnamese congregation, Archbishop Pierre Martin Ngô Đình Thục died in 1984.

U.S. Highways 66 and 71 came through town in the 1920s, and for a time the town saw a stream of cross-country traffic. Route 66 intersected with U.S. Route 71 at the present intersection of Central and Garrison Avenue. The original owners of a Boots Court motel at this crossroads promoted a drive-in restaurant with a KDMO AM radio broadcast, "Breakfast at the Crossroads of America", named as a reference to the two major highways of the era. Route 66 was eventually re-routed, and then replaced in the 1960s with Interstate 44 running south of town.

In the late 20th century, the town began actively courting tourism, emphasizing its history (the Battle of Carthage, Victorian architecture, and Route 66), as well as its proximity to the Precious Moments hotel and store, along with the popular country music destination Branson, Missouri.

Geography
Carthage is located south of the Spring River along US Route 71. Joplin is approximately twelve miles to the southwest and Neosho is about 17 miles to the south.

Demographics

Carthage is part of the Joplin, Missouri Metropolitan Statistical Area.

2010 census
As of the census of 2010, there were 14,378 people, 5,169 households, and 3,419 families living in the city. The racial makeup of the city was 73.6% White, 1.5% African American, 1.0% Native American, 1.0% Asian, 0.6% Pacific Islander, 18.9% from other races, and 3.4% from two or more races. Hispanic or Latino of any race were 25.6% of the population.

There were 5,169 households, of which 38.9% had children under the age of 18 living with them, 45.2% were married couples living together, 14.6% had a female householder with no husband present, 6.3% had a male householder with no wife present, and 33.9% were non-families. 29.2% of all households were made up of individuals, and 13.6% had someone living alone who was 65 years of age or older. The average household size was 2.69 and the average family size was 3.26.

The median age in the city was 32 years. 28.8% of residents were under the age of 18; 10.6% were between the ages of 18 and 24; 25.9% were from 25 to 44; 20.7% were from 45 to 64; and 13.9% were 65 years of age or older. The gender makeup of the city was 48.9% male and 51.1% female.

2000 census
At the 2000 census, there were 12,668 people, 4,813 households and 3,157 families living in the city. The population density was 1,328.2 per square mile (512.7/km). There were 5,217 housing units at an average density of 547.0 per square mile (211.1/km). The racial makeup of the city was 81.46% White, 2.39% African American, 1.05% Native American, 1.59% Asian, 0.21% Pacific Islander, 6.65% from other races, and 4.94% from two or more races. Hispanic or Latino of any race were 18.27% of the population.

There were 4,813 households, of which 30.9% had children under the age of 18 living with them, 49.5% were married couples living together, 11.9% had a female householder with no husband present, and 34.4% were non-families. 30.0% of all households were made up of individuals, and 16.4% had someone living alone who was 65 years of age or older. The average household size was 2.49 and the average family size was 3.04.

25.4% of the population were under the age of 18, 10.9% from 18 to 24, 27.4% from 25 to 44, 18.6% from 45 to 64, and 17.6% who were 65 years of age or older. The median age was 35 years. For every 100 females, there were 95.2 males. For every 100 females age 18 and over, there were 89.7 males.

The median household income was $32,557 and the median family income was $37,927. Males had a median income of $29,315 compared with $21,442 for females. The per capita income for the city was $15,281. About 12.7% of families and 19.2% of the population were below the poverty line, including 23.5% of those under age 18 and 13.0% of those age 65 or over.

Economy
Major area employers include Leggett & Platt, a Fortune 500 corporation manufacturing household durables, which is headquartered in the town, H.E. Williams, Inc. (a manufacturer of home electric lighting implements), Otts Foods, Schreiber Foods, and Goodman Manufacturing (all producing various food products) and the Carthage Underground, formerly a quarry, which now serves as a storage area with climate control for various products. Carthage was well known in the early 20th century for the fine-grained, extremely dense grey limestone, "Carthage Marble", which came from that mine and was used for numerous public buildings throughout the US, including the Capitol Building in Jefferson City and the Jasper County Courthouse.

Carthage has several food manufacturers and processing plants in and around the city. These plants produce a great deal of slaughterhouse waste. Changing World Technologies and its subsidiary Renewable Environment Solutions built the first operational commercial thermal conversion plant in the United States to take advantage of the large amount of feedstock for the thermal conversion process made available by the many food rendering plants in the area in 2003.

In January 2008, a new city-owned hospital, McCune-Brooks, opened and the old facility has been renovated for use by the Carthage Water and Electric Plant. The new Carthage High School opened in 2009.

The Dyno Nobel plant in Carthage is the only facility manufacturing dynamite in North America.

Education and extracurricular activities 

Carthage R-IX School District operates five elementary schools, an intermediate center, Carthage Jr. High School and Carthage High School.

The town has a lending library, the Carthage Public Library.

Arts and culture

As noted above, Carthage was the site of the Battle of Carthage, the first official engagement of the American Civil War, on July 5, 1861. Local groups stage reenactments of the battle, near the grounds of the State Historic Site which commemorates the event.

Carthage is located on Historic U.S. Route 66. The original alignment around town is still marked, and several old businesses built to cater to travelers can still be seen.

Since 1966, Carthage has held a festival each October called the Maple Leaf Festival. The week-long festival is named for the many maple trees that grow in the town, whose leaves change into bright colors such as red, orange, and yellow in the fall.

Since 1978, Carthage has hosted the annual Marian Days celebration for Vietnamese American Catholics. The event, which typically draws 50,000 to 70,000 attendees, takes place on the  campus of the Congregation of the Mother Co-Redemptrix.

Carthage is also the home of the Precious Moments Park and Chapel, a tourist attraction with paintings and oversized depictions of the popular porcelain figurines.

Histories of Carthage include Ward L. Schrantz's Jasper County Missouri in the Civil War (Carthage, Missouri: The Carthage, Missouri Kiwanis Club, 1923), History of Jasper County, Missouri (Des Moines, Iowa: Mills & Company, 1883) and Images of America: Carthage, Missouri (Chicago, Illinois: Arcadia Publishing, 2000).

Victorian era homes of Carthage are featured in It Wasn't A Dream, It Was A Flood, a 1974 autobiographical, 16mm short film about poet Frank Stanford.

Composer James Scott, regarded as one of the three most important composers of classic ragtime, lived in Carthage from 1901 to 1906. Scott attended Lincoln High School and worked in the music store of Charles L. Dumars. Demand for the music of Scott, who began to compose while living in Carthage, convinced Dumars to publish Scott's "A Summer Breeze" in 1903.

Government
The government of Carthage is represented by a Mayor-council government. Carthage is divided into five wards, each represented by two members. Ward 1 is currently represented by Brandi Ensor and Robin Harrison. Ward 2 is represented by Trudy Blankenship and Dave Armstrong, and Ward 3 is represented by Ceri Otero and Robin Blair. Ward 4 is currently represented by Ed Hardesty and Alan Snow. And Ward 5 is currently represented by Mark Elliff and Ed Barlow.

Carthage is in Missouri's 7th congressional district and has been represented in the United States Congress by Billy Long since 2010.

In the Missouri House of Representatives, Carthage is in the 163rd District and has been represented by Cody Smith since 2017. In the Missouri Senate, Bill White has represented the Joplin-Carthage area in the Missouri State Senate District 32 since 2019.

The Carthage Police Department is the law enforcement agency in the city of Carthage, which currently employs 29 Officers.

Notable people
 Gideon Winans Allen, (1835–1912), was a member of the Wisconsin State Assembly.
 Raymond P. Ayres, (b 1944) is an American military officer who held the rank of Lieutenant general in the United States Marine Corps.
 Annie White Baxter (1894-1944), first female elected official in Missouri, first woman elected county clerk in the United States
 Emily Newell Blair (1877–1951), American writer, suffragist, national Democratic Party political leader, a founder of the League of Women Voters, and feminist
 Marcus B. Bell (1893–1981), U.S. Army brigadier general
 A. P. (Ace) Borger (1888–1934), oil wildcatter and businessman associated with Texas
 Jann Carl (b. 1960), television personality, Entertainment Tonight
 Frances Crowe (1919-2019), peace activist
Tom Flanigan, former member of the Missouri House of Representatives
 Carl Hubbell (1903–1988), Baseball Hall of Fame pitcher for the New York Giants.
 Janet L. Kavandi (b. 1959), astronaut (STS-91, STS-99, STS-104)
 Celia Kaye, (b 1942) is an American actress.
 Preston Lacy, (b 1969) is a stunt performer, actor, comedian and one of the stars of the reality stunt show Jackass
 David Newell,(1905–1980) was primarily known as an American character actor,
 Marlin Perkins (1905–1986), zoologist, naturalist and host of Mutual of Omaha's Wild Kingdom
 Belle Starr (Myra MayBelle Shirley) (1848–1889), famous Wild West outlaw
 Bertha Teague (1906–1991), basketball coach, member of Basketball Hall of Fame
 Richard M. Webster (1922–1990), former Speaker of the Missouri House of Representatives and member of the Missouri Senate
 William L. Webster, (b. 1953) former Missouri Attorney General 
 Felix Wright, (b. 1959) NFL football player.
 Charles Wright, (b 1964) is a former football player.

References

External links

 City of Carthage official website

 Carthage Chamber of Commerce
 Carthage Convention & Visitors Bureau

Cities in Missouri
Cities in Jasper County, Missouri
County seats in Missouri
Joplin, Missouri, metropolitan area
Populated places established in 1842
1842 establishments in Missouri
Missouri in the American Civil War